Frank C. Damrell Jr. (born July 6, 1938) is a former United States district judge of the United States District Court for the Eastern District of California. He is also a Trustee of the University of California at Merced.
 In CAPEEM v. Noonan, he extended the right of educational entities to use the n-word with immunity from challenges under the Equal Protection Clause to school textbooks adopted by the State Board of Education, a right that had been granted to the Board of Education for use in literary works due to the ruling in Monteiro v. Tempe Union.

Early life and education

Born in Modesto, California, Damrell received a Bachelor of Arts degree from the University of California, Berkeley in 1961 and a Bachelor of Laws from Yale Law School in 1964.

Career

Damrell was a deputy in the Office of the State Attorney General of California from 1964 to 1966. He was a deputy district attorney of Office of the District Attorney, California from 1966 to 1968. He was in private practice in Modesto from 1968 to 1997.

Federal judicial service

Damrell is a former United States District Judge of the United States District Court for the Eastern District of California. Damrell was nominated by President Bill Clinton on July 24, 1997, to a seat vacated by Edward J. Garcia. He was confirmed by the United States Senate on November 9, 1997, and received his commission on November 12, 1997. When he was appointed to the court, his connections to the Gallo family generated controversy. He assumed senior status on December 31, 2008. He retired on December 1, 2011.

References

Sources

1938 births
Living people
Judges of the United States District Court for the Eastern District of California
People from Modesto, California
United States district court judges appointed by Bill Clinton
University of California, Berkeley alumni
Yale Law School alumni
20th-century American judges
21st-century American judges